This is a Chronological list of Bengali language authors (regardless of nationality or religion), by the order of their year of birth. Alphabetical order is used only when chronological order cannot be ascertained.

The list also marks the winners of major international and national awards:

 Nobel Prize winners are marked with 
 Ramon Magsaysay Award winners are marked with: 
 Bharat Ratna winners are marked with: 
 Padma Vibhushan winners are marked with: 
 Padma Bhushan winners are marked with:
 Independence Day Award winners are marked with: 
 Ekushey Padak winners are marked with: 
 Banga-Vibhushan winners are marked with:

For an alphabetic listing of Bengali language authors please refer to alphabetic list of Bengali language authors.

Ancient age

 Aryadev (9th century)
 Bhusukupa (9th century)
 Dhendhanpa (9th century)
 Dombipa (9th century)
 Kahnapa (9th century)
 Kukkuripa (9th century)
 Luipa (9th century)
 Minapa (9th century)
 Sarhapa (9th century)
 Shabarpa (9th century)

Middle age

 Nur Qutb Alam (14th century)
 Shah Muhammad Saghir (14th century)
 Zainuddin (15th century)
 Ramai Pandit (15th century)
 Boru Chandidas (15th century)
 Krittibas Ojha (1443–15??)
 Krishnadasa Kaviraja (1496 – 15??)
 Dawlat Wazir Bahram Khan (16th century)
 Dom Antonio (16th century)
 Kashiram Das (16th century)
 Dwija Madhab (16th century) 
 Syed Sultan (1550–1648)
 Alaol (1606–1680)
 Afzal Ali (17th century)
 Abdul Hakim (17th century)
 Daulat Quazi (17th century)
 Rupram Chakrabarty (17th century)

18th century

 Heyat Mahmud (1693–1760)
 Bharatchandra Ray (1712–1760)
 Muhammad Muqim
 Ramprasad Sen (1720–1781)
 Rahimunnessa (1763–1800)
 Ramram Basu (1751–1813)

19th century

 Ishwar Chandra Gupta (1812–1859)
 Peary Chand Mitra (1814–1882)
 Ishwar Chandra Vidyasagar (1820–1891)
 Lal Behari Dey (1824–1892)
 Michael Madhusudan Dutt (1824–1873)
 Rajnarayan Basu (1826–1892)
 Dinabandhu Mitra (1830–1873)
 Sanjib Chandra Chattopadhyay (1834–1889)
 Girish Chandra Sen (1835/1836-1910)
 Bankim Chandra Chattopadhyay (1838–1894)
 Kaliprasanna Singha (1840–1870)
 Dwijendranath Tagore (1840-1926) 
 Girish Chandra Ghosh (1844–1912)
 Mir Mosharraf Hossain (1847–1912)
 Nabinchandra Sen (1847–1909)
 Troilokyanath Mukhopadhyay (1847–1919)
 Romesh Chunder Dutt (1848–1909)
 Jyotirindranath Tagore (1849–1925)
 Hara Prasad Shastri (1853–1931)
 Hason Raja (1854–1922)
 Jagdish Chandra Bose (1858–1937)
 Sheikh Abdur Rahim (1859–1931)
 Akkhoykumar Boral (1860–1919)
 Jaladhar Sen (1860–1939)
 Rabindranath Tagore (1861–1941) 
 Dwijendralal Ray (1863–1913)
 Upendrakishore Ray Chowdhury (1863–1915)
 Swami Vivekananda (1863–1902)
 Ashutosh Mukherjee (1864–1924)
 Kamini Roy (1864–1933)
 Ramendra Sundar Tribedi (1864–1919)
 Rajanikanta Sen  (1865–1910)
 Dinesh Chandra Sen (1866–1939)
 Gaganendranath Tagore (1867–1938)
 Pramatha Chowdhury (1868–1946)
 Abdul Karim Sahitya Bisharad (1869–1953)  
 Abanindranath Tagore (1871–1951)
 Priyamvada Devi (1871–1935)
 Ekramuddin Ahmad (1872–1940)
 Provatkumar Mukhopadhyay (1873–1932)
 Sharat Chandra Chattopadhyay (1876–1938)
 Dakshinaranjan Mitra Majumder (1877–1957)
 Jatindramohan Bagchi (1878–1948)
 Ismail Hossain Shiraji (1880–1931)
 Rajshekhar Bose (1880–1960)
 Syed Emdad Ali (1880–1956)
 Qazi Imdadul Haq (1882–1926)
 Satyendranath Dutta (1882–1922)
 Sheikh Fazlul Karim (1882–1936)
 Hemendrakumar Roy (1883–1963)
 Kumud Ranjan Mullick (1883–1970)
 Nirupama Devi (1883–1951)
 Gobindachandra Das (1885–1918)
 Muhammad Shahidullah (1885–1969) 
 Rakhaldas Bandyopadhyay (1885–1930)
 Jagadish Gupta (1886–1957)
 Sukumar Ray (1887–1923)
 Eyakub Ali Chowdhury (1888–1940)
 Mohitolal Majumdar (1888–1952)
 Kalidas Roy (1889–1975)
 Mohammad Lutfur Rahman (1889–1936)
 Suniti Kumar Chatterji (1890–1970) 
 S. Wajid Ali (1890–1951)
 Premankur Atorthy (1890–1964)
 Sachin Sengupta (1891–1961)
 Sahadat Hussain (1893–1953)
 Rahul Sankrityayan (1893–1963)
 Bibhuti Bhushan Bandopadhyay (1894–1950)
 Bibhutibhushan Mukhopadhyay (1894–1987)
 Golam Mostofa (1897–1964)
 Nirad C. Chaudhuri (1897–1999)
 Qazi Motahar Hossain (1897–1981) 
 Abul Mansur Ahmed (1898–1979) 
 Mahbubul Alam (1898–1981)
 Mohammad Barkatullah (1898–1974)
 Tarashankar Bandopadhyaya (1898–1971)
 Jibanananda Das (1899–1954)
 Sharadindu Bandyopadhyay (1899–1970)
 Kazi Nazrul Islam (1899–1976) 
 Balai Chand Mukhopadhyay (1899–1979)

Early 20th century

 Ekramuddin Ahmad (1872–1940)
 Sajanikanta Das (1900–1962)
 Aroj Ali Matubbar (1900–1985)
 Sukumar Sen (1900–1992)
 Amiya Chakravarty (1901–1986)
 Sudhindranath Dutta (1901–1960)
 Manoj Basu (1901–1987)
 Abul Fazal (1903–1983)
 Benojir Ahmed (1903–1983)
 Achintyakumar Sengupta (1903–1976)
 Shibram Chakraborty (1903–1980)
 Jasimuddin (1903–1976) 
 Motaher Hussain Chowdhury (1903–1956)
 Premendra Mitra (1904–1988)
 Syed Mujtaba Ali (1904–1974) 
 Annada Shankar Ray (1904–2002)
 Abdul Kadir (1906–1984)  
 Humayun Kabir (1906–1969)
 Satinath Bhaduri (1906–1965)
 Bande Ali Mia (1907–1979)
 Satyen Sen (1907–1981)
 Nurul Momen 'Natyaguru' (1908–1990) 
 Buddhadeb Bosu (1908–1974)
 Dewan Mohammad Azraf (1908–1999) 
 Manik Bandopadhyay (1908–1956)
 Gajendra Kumar Mitra (1908–1994)
 Leela Majumdar (1908–2007)
 Ashapoorna Devi (1909–1995)
 Bishnu Dey (1909–1982)
 Arun Mitra (1909–2000)
 Subodh Ghosh (1909–1980)
 Nihar Ranjan Gupta (1911–1986)
 Abujafar Shamsuddin (1911–1989) 
 Begum Sufia Kamal (1911–1999)  
 Jyotirindranath Nandi (1912–1982)
 Bimal Mitra (1912–1991)
 Dinesh Das (1913–1985)
 Adwaita Mallabarman (1914–1951)
 Kamal Kumar Majumdar (1914–1979)
 Protiva Bose (1915–2006)
 Narendranath Mitra (1916–1975)
 Samar Sen (1916–1987)
 Khudiram Das (1916–2002)
Maniklal Sinha (1916-1994)
 Ahsan Habib (1917–1985)  
 Akbar Hussain (1917–1980)
 Bijan Bhatacharya (1917–1978)
 Dinesh Chandra Chattopadhyay (1917–1995)
 Shawkat Osman (1917–1998)  
 Amiya Bhūşhan Majumdār (1918–2001)
 Farrukh Ahmed (1918–1974) 
 Narayan Gangopadhyay (1918–1970)
 Sarder Jayenuddin (1918–1986)
 Sikandar Abu Zafar (1919–1975)  
 Abu Rushd (1919–2010)
 Subhas Mukhopadhyay (1919–2003)
 Nilima Ibrahim (1921–2002)
 Ahmed Sharif (1921–1999) 
 Satyajit Ray (1921–1992)   
 Prabhat Ranjan Sarkar (1921–1990)
 Bimal Kar (1921–2003)
 Ramapada Chowdhury (1922–2018)
 Syed Ali Ahsan (1922–2002) 
 Syed Waliullah (1922–1971) 
 Shaktipada Rajguru (1922–2014)
 Gour Kishore Ghosh (1923–2000)
 Samaresh Basu (1924–1988)
 Narayan Sanyal (1924–2005)
 Badal Sarkar (1925–2011)
 Munier Chowdhury (1925–1971) 
 Rashid Karim (1925–2011) 
 Ritwik Ghatak (1925–1976)
 Shahed Ali (1925–2001) 
 Abu Ishaque (1926–2003) 
 Romena Afaz (1926–2003)
 Mahasweta Devi (1926–2016)   
 Mufazzal Haider Chaudhury (1926–1971)
 Narayan Debnath (1925-2022)
 Shamsuddin Abul Kalam (1926–1997)  
 Sukanta Bhattacharya (1926–1947)
 Lokenath Bhattacharya (1927–2001)
 Mahbub Ul Alam Choudhury (1927–2007)
 Shahidullah Kaiser (1927–1971) 
 Anwar Pasha (1928–1971)
 Abdur Rouf Choudhury (1929–1996)
 Jahanara Imam (1929–1994)
 M. R. Akhtar Mukul (1929–2004) 
 Shamsur Rahman (1929–2006)  
 Utpal Dutt (1929–1993)
 Abdullah-Al-Muti (1930–1998) 
 Syed Mustafa Siraj (1930–2012)
 Moti Nandi (1931–2010)
 Sailen Ghosh (1931–2016)
 Kabita Sinha (1931–1999)
 Nimai Bhattacharya (1931–2020)
 Alauddin Al-Azad (1932–2006) 
 Muhammad Mohar Ali (1932–2007) (King Faisal International Prize for Islamic Studies in 2000)
 Shankha Ghosh (1932–2021)
 Nikhil Sarkar (Sripantha) (1932–2004)
 Adrish Bardhan (1932–2019)
 Mani Shankar Mukherjee (born 1933)
 Amartya Sen (born 1933)  
 Anil Kumar Dutta (1933–2006)
 Sandipan Chattopadhyay (1933–2005)
 Samir Roychoudhury (1933–2016)
 Alokeranjan Dasgupta (1933–2020) 
 Purnendu Patri (1933–1997)
 Abdul Gaffar Choudhury (1934-2022) 
 Atin Bandyopadhyay (1934-2019)
 Sudhir Chakravarti (1934–2020) 
 Binoy Majumdar (1934–2006)
 Mohit Chattopadhyay (1934–2012)
 Sunil Gangopadhyay (1934–2012)
 Shakti Chattopadhyay (1934–1995)
 Zahir Raihan (1935–1972)  
 Rabeya Khatun (1935-2021)
 Shahid Akhand (born 1935)
 Shirshendu Mukhopadhyay (born 1935)
 Syed Shamsul Haque (1935–2016)   
 Abubakar Siddique (born 1936)
 Al Mahmud (1936–2019) 
 Amiya Kumar Bagchi (born 1936)
 Bashir Al Helal (1936-2021)
 Buddhadeb Guha (1936-2021)
 Dilara Hashim (born 1936)
 Jatin Sarker (born 1936)
 Razia Khan (1936–2011) 
 Tarapada Roy (1936–2007)
 Sanjib Chattopadhyay (born 1936)
 Debesh Roy (1936–2020)
 Hosne Ara Shahed (born 1937)
 Dilwar Khan (1937–2013)
 Tahrunessa Abdullah (born 1937) 
 Makbula Manzoor (1938-2020)
 Nabaneeta Dev Sen (1938–2019)
 Malay Roy Choudhury (born 1939)
 Abdullah Abu Sayeed (born 1939) 
 Bani Basu (born 1939)
 Dibyendu Palit (1939–2019)
 Hasan Azizul Huq (1939-2021)
 Hasnat Abdul Hye (born 1939)
 Iffat Ara (born 1939)
 Rizia Rahman (1939–2019)
 Bipradash Barua (born 1940)
 Rahat Khan (1940–2020) 
 Sasthipada Chattopadhyay (born 1941)
 Abdul Mannan Syed (1943–2010)
 Ahmed Sofa (1943–2006)
 Akhtaruzzaman Elias (1943–1997)
 Asad Chowdhury (born 1943)
 Buddhadeb Bhattacharya (born 1944)
 Samaresh Majumdar (born 1944)
 Nirmalendu Goon (born 1945)
 Prabir Ghosh (born 1945)
 Haripada Datta (born 1947)
 Humayun Azad (1947–2004)
 Taradas Bandyopadhyay (1947–2010)
 Selina Hossain (born 1947)
 Nabarun Bhattacharya (1948–2014)
 Humayun Ahmed (1948–2012 )
 Abul Bashar (born 1949)
 Mohammad Nurul Huda (born 1949)

Late 20th century

 Ekram Ali (born 1950)
 Manoranjan Byapari (born 1950)
 Nabakumar Basu (born 1949)
 Suchitra Bhattacharya (1950–2015 )
 Muhammed Zafar Iqbal (born 1952)
 Shahidul Jahir (1953–2008)
 Pranabkumar Chattopadhyay ( born 1953) 
 Joy Goswami (born 1954)
 Imdadul Haq Milan (born 1955)
 Rudra Mohammad Shahidullah (1956–1992)
 Anil Ghorai (born 1957)
 Moinul Ahsan Saber (born 1958)
 Subodh Sarkar (born 1958)
 Nrisingha Prasad Bhaduri
 Tridib Kumar Chattopadhyay (born 1958)
 Mallika Sengupta (1960–2011)
 Rabisankar Bal (1962–2017)
 Taslima Nasrin (born 1962)
 Prachet Gupta (born 1962)
 Humayun Kabir Dhali (born 1964)
 Anisul Hoque (born 1965)
 Rashid Askari (born 1965)
 Nasreen Jahan (born 1966)
 Sezan Mahmud (born 1967)
 Baby Halder (born 1973)
 Moniruddin Khan (born 1974)
 Srijato (born 1975)
 Subhro Bandopadhyay (born 1978)
 Aveek Sarkar (born 1979) 
 Himanish Goswami
 Chandril Bhattacharya
 Chinmoy Guha
 Abul Bashar ( 1951)

References 

 Biletey Bishshotoker Bangla Kobi, Robbani Chowdhury, Agamee Prokasion, Dhaka, 2000
 History of Bengali Literature, Rabbani Choudhury, Utso, Dhaka, 2010
 Bangla Literature, an English magazine edited by Sayeed Abybakar 

Bengali
 

de:Liste bengalischer Schriftsteller